Social work is an academic discipline and practice-based profession concerned with meeting the basic needs of individuals, families, groups, communities, and society as a whole to enhance their individual and collective well-being. Social work practice draws from areas, such as psychology, sociology, health, political science, community development, law, and economics to engage with systems and policies, conduct assessments, develop interventions, and enhance social functioning and responsibility. The ultimate goals of social work include the improvement of people's lives, alleviation of biopsychosocial concerns, empowerment of individuals and communities, and the achievement of social justice.

Social work practice is often divided into three levels. Micro-work involves working directly with individuals and families, such as providing individual counseling/therapy or assisting a family in accessing services. Mezzo-work involves working with groups and communities, such as conducting group therapy or providing services for community agencies. Macro-work involves fostering change on a larger scale through advocacy, social policy, research development, non-profit and public service administration, or working with government agencies. Starting in the 1980s, a few universities began social work management programmes, to prepare students for the management of social and human service organizations, in addition to classical social work education.

The social work profession developed in the 19th century, with some of its roots in voluntary philanthropy and in grassroots organizing. However, responses to social needs had existed long before then, primarily from public almshouses, private charities and religious organizations. The effects of the Industrial Revolution and of the Great Depression of the 1930s placed pressure on social work to become a more defined discipline as social workers responded to the child welfare concerns related to widespread poverty and reliance on child labor in industrial settings.

Definition 
Social work is a broad profession that intersects with several disciplines. Social work organizations offer the following definitions:

Social work is a practice-based profession and an academic discipline that promotes social change and development, social cohesion, and the empowerment and liberation of people. Principles of social justice, human rights, collective responsibility and respect for diversities are central to social work. Underpinned by theories of social work, social sciences, humanities, and indigenous knowledge, social work engages people and structures to address life challenges and enhance well-being.
—International Federation of Social Workers

Social work is a profession concerned with helping individuals, families, groups and communities to enhance their individual and collective well-being. It aims to help people develop their skills and their ability to use their resources and those of the community to resolve problems. Social work is concerned with individual and personal problems but also with broader social issues such as poverty, unemployment, and domestic violence.
— Canadian Association of Social Workers

Social work practice consists of the professional application of social  principles, and techniques to one or more of the following ends: helping people obtain tangible services; counseling and psychotherapy with individuals, families, and groups; helping communities or groups provide or improve social and health services, and participating in legislative processes. The practice of social work requires knowledge of human development and behavior; of social and economic, and cultural institutions; and the interaction of all these factors.
—National Association of Social Workers

Social workers work with individuals and families to help improve outcomes in their lives. This may be helping to protect vulnerable people from harm or abuse or supporting people to live independently. Social workers support people, act as advocates and direct people to the services they may require. Social workers often work in multi-disciplinary teams alongside health and education professionals.
—British Association of Social Workers

History

The practice and profession of social work has a relatively modern and scientific origin, and is generally considered to have developed out of three strands. The first was individual casework, a strategy pioneered by the Charity Organization Society in the mid-19th century, which was founded by Helen Bosanquet and Octavia Hill in London, England. Most historians identify COS as the pioneering organization of the social theory that led to the emergence of social work as a professional occupation. COS had its main focus on individual casework. The second was social administration, which included various forms of poverty relief – 'relief of paupers'. Statewide poverty relief could be said to have its roots in the English Poor Laws of the 17th century but was first systematized through the efforts of the Charity Organization Society. The third consisted of social action – rather than engaging in the resolution of immediate individual requirements, the emphasis was placed on political action working through the community and the group to improve their social conditions and thereby alleviate poverty. This approach was developed originally by the Settlement House Movement.

This was accompanied by a less easily defined movement; the development of institutions to deal with the entire range of social problems. All had their most rapid growth during the nineteenth century, and laid the foundation basis for modern social work, both in theory and in practice.

Professional social work originated in 19th century England, and had its roots in the social and economic upheaval wrought by the Industrial Revolution, in particular, the societal struggle to deal with the resultant mass urban-based poverty and its related problems. Because poverty was the main focus of early social work, it was intricately linked with the idea of charity work.

Other important historical figures that shaped the growth of the social work profession are Jane Addams, who founded the Hull House in Chicago and won the Nobel Peace Prize in 1931; Mary Ellen Richmond, who wrote Social Diagnosis, one of the first social workbooks to incorporate law, medicine, psychiatry, psychology, and history; and William Beveridge, who created the social welfare state, framing the debate on social work within the context of social welfare provision.

United States
During the 1840s, Dorothea Lynde Dix, a retired Boston teacher who is considered the founder of the Mental Health Movement, began a crusade that would change the way people with mental disorders were viewed and treated. Dix was not a social worker; the profession was not established until after she died in 1887. However, her life and work were embraced by early psychiatric social workers, and she is considered one of the pioneers of psychiatric social work along with Elizabeth Horton, who in 1907 was the first psychiatric social worker in the New York hospital system, and others.

The early twentieth century was a time of progressive change in attitudes towards mental illness. The Community Mental Health Centers Act was passed in 1963. This policy encouraged the deinstitutionalisation of people with mental illness. Later, the mental health consumer movement came by 1980s. A consumer was defined as a person who has received or is currently receiving services for a psychiatric condition. People with mental disorders and their families became advocates for better care. Building public understanding and awareness through consumer advocacy helped bring mental illness and its treatment into mainstream medicine and social services. The 2000s saw the managed care movement, which aimed at a health care delivery system to eliminate unnecessary and inappropriate care to reduce costs, and the recovery movement, which by principle acknowledges that many people with serious mental illness spontaneously recover and others recover and improve with proper treatment.

Social workers made an impact with 2003 invasion of Iraq and War in Afghanistan (2001–2021); social workers worked out of NATO hospitals in Afghanistan and Iraqi bases. They made visits to provide counseling services at forward operating bases. Twenty-two percent of the clients were diagnosed with posttraumatic stress disorder, 17 percent with depression, and 7 percent with alcohol use disorder. In 2009, there was a high level of suicides among active-duty soldiers: 160 confirmed or suspected Army suicides. In 2008, the Marine Corps had a record 52 suicides. The stress of long and repeated deployments to war zones, the dangerous and confusing nature of both wars, wavering public support for the wars, and reduced troop morale all contributed to escalating mental health issues. Military and civilian social workers served a critical role in the veterans' health care system.

Mental health services is a loose network of services ranging from highly structured inpatient psychiatric units to informal support groups, where psychiatric social workers indulges in the diverse approaches in multiple settings along with other paraprofessional workers.

Canada
A role for psychiatric social workers was established early in Canada's history of service delivery in the field of population health. Native North Americans understood mental trouble as an indication of an individual who had lost their equilibrium with the sense of place and belonging in general, and with the rest of the group in particular. In native healing beliefs, health and mental health were inseparable, so similar combinations of natural and spiritual remedies were often employed to relieve both mental and physical illness. These communities and families greatly valued holistic approaches for preventive health care. Indigenous peoples in Canada have faced cultural oppression and social marginalization through the actions of European colonizers and their institutions since the earliest periods of contact. Culture contact brought with it many forms of depredation. Economic, political, and religious institutions of the European settlers all contributed to the displacement and oppression of indigenous people.

The first officially recorded treatment practices were in 1714, when Quebec opened wards for the mentally ill. In the 1830s social services were active through charity organizations and church parishes (Social Gospel Movement). Asylums for the insane were opened in 1835 in Saint John and New Brunswick. In 1841 in Toronto care for the mentally ill became institutionally based. Canada became a self-governing dominion in 1867, retaining its ties to the British crown. During this period, age of industrial capitalism began and it led to social and economic dislocation in many forms. By 1887 asylums were converted to hospitals, and nurses and attendants were employed for the care of the mentally ill. The first social work training began at the University of Toronto in 1914. In 1918 Dr. Clarence Hincks and Clifford Beers founded the Canadian National Committee for Mental Hygiene, which later became the Canadian Mental Health Association. In the 1930s Hincks promoted prevention and of treating sufferers of mental illness before they were incapacitated (early detection).

World War II profoundly affected attitudes towards mental health. The medical examinations of recruits revealed that thousands of apparently healthy adults suffered mental difficulties. This knowledge changed public attitudes towards mental health, and stimulated research into preventive measures and methods of treatment. In 1951 Mental Health Week was introduced across Canada. For the first half of the twentieth century, with a period of deinstitutionalisation beginning in the late 1960s psychiatric social work succeeded to the current emphasis on community-based care, psychiatric social work focused beyond the medical model's aspects on individual diagnosis to identify and address social inequities and structural issues. In the 1980s Mental Health Act was amended to give consumers the right to choose treatment alternatives. Later the focus shifted to workforce mental health issues and environmental root causes.

In Ontario, the regulator, the Ontario College of Social Workers and Social Service Workers (OCSWSSW) regulates two professions, registered social workers (RSW) and registered social service workers (RSSW). The Ontario Association of Social Workers (OASW) is the professional body of social workers, while the Ontario Social Service Worker Association (OSSWA) is the professional body of social service workers.

India
The earliest citing of mental disorders in India are from Vedic Era (2000 BC – AD 600). Charaka Samhita, an ayurvedic textbook believed to be from 400 to 200 BC describes various factors of mental stability. It also has instructions regarding how to set up a care delivery system. In the same era, Siddha was a medical system in south India. The great sage Agastya was one of the 18 siddhas contributing to a system of medicine. This system has included the Agastiyar Kirigai Nool, a compendium of psychiatric disorders and their recommended treatments. In Atharva Veda too there are descriptions and resolutions about mental health afflictions. In the Mughal period Unani system of medicine was introduced by an Indian physician Unhammad in 1222. The existing form of psychotherapy was known then as ilaj-i-nafsani in Unani medicine.

The 18th century was a very unstable period in Indian history, which contributed to psychological and social chaos in the Indian subcontinent. In 1745, lunatic asylums were developed in Bombay (Mumbai) followed by Calcutta (Kolkata) in 1784, and Madras (Chennai) in 1794. The need to establish hospitals became more acute, first to treat and manage Englishmen and Indian 'sepoys' (military men) employed by the British East India Company. The First Lunacy Act (also called Act No. 36) that came into effect in 1858 was later modified by a committee appointed in Bengal in 1888. Later, the Indian Lunacy Act, 1912 was brought under this legislation. A rehabilitation programme was initiated between 1870s and 1890s for persons with mental illness at the Mysore Lunatic Asylum, and then an occupational therapy department was established during this period in almost each of the lunatic asylums. The programme in the asylum was called 'work therapy'. In this programme, persons with mental illness were involved in the field of agriculture for all activities. This programme is considered as the seed of origin of psychosocial rehabilitation in India.

Berkeley-Hill, superintendent of the European Hospital (now known as the Central Institute of Psychiatry (CIP), established in 1918), was deeply concerned about the improvement of mental hospitals in those days. The sustained efforts of Berkeley-Hill helped to raise the standard of treatment and care and he also persuaded the government to change the term 'asylum' to 'hospital' in 1920. Techniques similar to the current token-economy were first started in 1920 and called by the name 'habit formation chart' at the CIP, Ranchi. In 1937, the first post of psychiatric social worker was created in the child guidance clinic run by the Dhorabji Tata School of Social Work (established in 1936). It is considered as the first documented evidence of social work practice in Indian mental health field.

After Independence in 1947, general hospital psychiatry units (GHPUs) were established to improve conditions in existing hospitals, while at the same time encouraging outpatient care through these units. In Amritsar Dr. Vidyasagar instituted active involvement of families in the care of persons with mental illness. This was advanced practice ahead of its times regarding treatment and care. This methodology had a greater impact on social work practice in the mental health field especially in reducing the stigmatisation. In 1948 Gauri Rani Banerjee, trained in the United States, started a master's course in medical and psychiatric social work at the Dhorabji Tata School of Social Work (now TISS). Later the first trained psychiatric social worker was appointed in 1949 at the adult psychiatry unit of Yerwada Mental Hospital, Pune.

In various parts of the country, in mental health service settings, social workers were employed—in 1956 at a mental hospital in Amritsar, in 1958 at a child guidance clinic of the college of nursing, and in Delhi in 1960 at the All India Institute of Medical Sciences and in 1962 at the Ram Manohar Lohia Hospital. In 1960, the Madras Mental Hospital (now Institute of Mental Health) employed social workers to bridge the gap between doctors and patients. In 1961 the social work post was created at the NIMHANS. In these settings they took care of the psychosocial aspect of treatment. This system enabled social service practices to have a stronger long-term impact on mental health care.

In 1966 by the recommendation Mental Health Advisory Committee, Ministry of Health, Government of India, NIMHANS commenced Department of Psychiatric Social Work started and a two-year Postgraduate Diploma in Psychiatric Social Work was introduced in 1968. In 1978, the nomenclature of the course was changed to MPhil in Psychiatric Social Work. Subsequently, a PhD Programme was introduced. By the recommendations Mudaliar committee in 1962, Diploma in Psychiatric Social Work was started in 1970 at the European Mental Hospital at Ranchi (now CIP). The program was upgraded and other higher training courses were added subsequently.

A new initiative to integrate mental health with general health services started in 1975 in India. The Ministry of Health, Government of India formulated the National Mental Health Programme (NMHP) and launched it in 1982. The same was reviewed in 1995 and based on that, the District Mental Health Program (DMHP) was launched in 1996 which sought to integrate mental health care with public health care. This model has been implemented in all the states and currently there are 125 DMHP sites in India.

National Human Rights Commission (NHRC) in 1998 and 2008 carried out systematic, intensive and critical examinations of mental hospitals in India. This resulted in recognition of the human rights of the persons with mental illness by the NHRC. From the NHRC's report as part of the NMHP, funds were provided for upgrading the facilities of mental hospitals. As a result of the study, it was revealed that there were more positive changes in the decade until the joint report of NHRC and NIMHANS in 2008 compared to the last 50 years until 1998. In 2016 Mental Health Care Bill was passed which ensures and legally entitles access to treatments with coverage from insurance, safeguarding dignity of the afflicted person, improving legal and healthcare access and allows for free medications. In December 2016, Disabilities Act 1995 was repealed with Rights of Persons with Disabilities Act (RPWD), 2016 from the 2014 Bill which ensures benefits for a wider population with disabilities. The Bill before becoming an Act was pushed for amendments by stakeholders mainly against alarming clauses in the "Equality and Non discrimination" section that diminishes the power of the act and allows establishments to overlook or discriminate against persons with disabilities and against the general lack of directives that requires to ensure the proper implementation of the Act.

Mental health in India is in its developing stages. There are not enough professionals to support the demand. According to the Indian Psychiatric Society, there are around 9000 psychiatrists only in the country as of January 2019. Going by this figure, India has 0.75 psychiatrists per 100,000 population, while the desirable number is at least 3 psychiatrists per 100,000. While the number of psychiatrists has increased since 2010, it is still far from a healthy ratio.

Lack of any universally accepted single licensing authority compared to foreign countries puts social workers at general in risk. But general bodies/councils accepts automatically a university-qualified social worker as a professional licensed to practice or as a qualified clinician. Lack of a centralized council in tie-up with Schools of Social Work also makes a decline in promotion for the scope of social workers as mental health professionals. Though in this midst the service of social workers has given a facelift to the mental health sector in the country with other allied professionals.

Theoretical models and practices
Social work is an interdisciplinary profession, meaning it draws from a number of areas, such as (but not limited to) psychology, sociology, politics, criminology, economics, ecology, education, health, law, philosophy, anthropology, and counseling, including psychotherapy. Field work is a distinctive attribution to social work pedagogy. This equips the trainee in understanding the theories and models within the field of work. Professional practitioners from multicultural aspects have their roots in this social work immersion engagements from the early 19th century in the western countries. As an example, here are some of the models and theories used within social work practice:

 Empathy
 Social case work
 Social group work
 Community organization
 Behavioral
 School social worker
 Leadership and management
 Crisis intervention
 Mental health
 Cognitive-behavioral
 Critical
 Radical
 Social insurance
 Ecological
 Equity theory
 Financial social work
 Motivational interviewing
 Medical social work
 Person-centered therapy
 Psychoanalytic
 Psychodynamic
 Existential
 Humanistic
 Sociotherapy
 Brief psychotherapy or solution-focused approach
 Recovery approach
 Reflexivity
 Social exchange
 Welfare economics
 Anti-oppressive practice
 Psychosocial rehabilitation
 Cognitive behavioral therapy
 Dialectical behavior therapy
 Systems theory
 Strength-based practice
 Task-centered
 Family therapy
 Advocacy
 Prevention science
 Project management
 Program evaluation and performance measurement
 Systems thinking
 Community development and intervention
 Positive psychology
 Social actions
 Veterinary

Profession
American educator Abraham Flexner in a 1915 lecture, "Is Social Work a Profession?", delivered at the National Conference on Charities and Corrections, examined the characteristics of a profession concerning social work. It is not a 'single model', such as that of health, followed by medical professions such as nurses and doctors, but an integrated profession, and the likeness with medical profession is that social work requires a continued study for professional development to retain knowledge and skills that are evidence-based by practice standards. A social work professional's services lead toward the aim of providing beneficial services to individuals, dyads, families, groups, organizations, and communities to achieve optimum psychosocial functioning.

Its seven core functions are described by Popple and Leighninger as:
 Engagement — the social worker must first engage the client in early meetings to promote a collaborative relationship
 Assessment — data must be gathered that will guide and direct a plan of action to help the client
 Planning — negotiate and formulate an action plan
 Implementation — promote resource acquisition and enhance role performance
 Monitoring/Evaluation — on-going documentation through short-term goal attainment of the extent to which client is following through
 Supportive Counseling — affirming, challenging, encouraging, informing, and exploring options
 Graduated Disengagement — seeking to replace the social worker with a naturally occurring resource

Six other core values identified by the National Association of Social Workers' (NASW) Code of Ethics are:

 Service — help people in need and address social problems
 Social Justice — challenge social injustices
 Dignity and worth of the person
 Importance of human relationships
 Integrity — behave in a trustworthy manner
 Competence — practice within the areas of one's areas of expertise and develop and enhance professional skill

A historic and defining feature of social work is the profession's focus on individual well-being in a social context and the well-being of society. Social workers promote social justice and social change with and on behalf of clients. A "client" can be an individual, family, group, organization, or community. In the broadening scope of the modern social worker's role, some practitioners have in recent years traveled to war-torn countries to provide psychosocial assistance to families and survivors.

Newer areas of social work practice involve management science. The growth of "social work administration" (sometimes also referred to as "social work management") for transforming social policies into services and directing activities of an organization toward achievement of goals is a related field. Helping clients with accessing benefits such as unemployment insurance and disability benefits, to assist individuals and families in building savings and acquiring assets to improve their financial security over the long-term, to manage large operations, etc. requires social workers to know financial management skills to help clients and organization's to be financially self-sufficient. Financial social work also helps clients with low-income or low to middle-income, people who are either unbanked (do not have a banking account) or underbanked (individuals who have a bank account but tend to rely on high cost non-bank providers for their financial transactions), with better mediation with financial institutions and induction of money management skills. Another area that social workers are focusing is risk management, risk in social work is taken as Knight in 1921 defined "If you don't even know for sure what will happen, but you know the odds, that is risk and If you don't even know the odds, that is uncertainty." Risk management in social work means minimizing the risks while increasing potential benefits for clients by analyzing the risks and benefits in the duty of care or decisions. Occupational social work is a field where the trained professionals assist a management with worker's welfare, in their psychosocial wellness, and helps management's policies and protocols to be humanistic and anti-oppressive.   

In the United States, according to the Substance Abuse and Mental Health Services Administration (SAMHSA), a branch of the U.S. Department of Health and Human Services, professional social workers are the largest group of mental health services providers. There are more clinically trained social workers—over 200,000—than psychiatrists, psychologists, and psychiatric nurses combined. Federal law and the National Institutes of Health recognize social work as one of five core mental health professions.

Examples of fields a social worker may be employed in are poverty relief, life skills education, community organizing, community organization, community development, rural development, forensics and corrections, legislation, industrial relations, project management, child protection, elder protection, women's rights, human rights, systems optimization, finance, addictions rehabilitation, child development, cross-cultural mediation, occupational safety and health, disaster management, mental health, psychosocial therapy, disabilities, etc.

Roles and functions
Social workers play many roles in mental health settings, including those of case manager, advocate, administrator, and therapist. The major functions of a psychiatric social worker are promotion and prevention, treatment, and rehabilitation. Social workers may also practice:

 Counseling and psychotherapy
 Case management and support services
 Crisis intervention
 Psychoeducation
 Psychiatric rehabilitation and recovery
 Care coordination and monitoring
 Program management/administration
 Program, policy and resource development
 Research and evaluation

Psychiatric social workers conduct psychosocial assessments of the patients and work to enhance patient and family communications with the medical team members and ensure the inter-professional cordiality in the team to secure patients with the best possible care and to be active partners in their care planning. Depending upon the requirement, social workers are often involved in illness education, counseling and psychotherapy. In all areas, they are pivotal to the aftercare process to facilitate a careful transition back to family and community.

Qualifications
The education of social workers begins with a bachelor's degree (BA, BSc, BSSW, BSW, etc.) or diploma in social work or a Bachelor of Social Services. Some countries offer postgraduate degrees in social work, such as a master's degree (MSW, MSSW, MSS, MSSA, MA, MSc, MRes, MPhil.) or doctoral studies (Ph.D. and DSW (Doctor of Social Work)). Increasingly, graduates of social work programs pursue post-masters and post-doctoral studies, including training in psychotherapy.

In the United States, social work undergraduate and master's programs are accredited by the Council on Social Work Education. A CSWE-accredited degree is required for one to become a state-licensed social worker. The CSWE even accredits online master's in social work programs in traditional and advanced standing options. In 1898, the New York Charity Organization Society, which was the Columbia University School of Social Work's earliest entity, began offering formal "social philanthropy" courses, marking both the beginning date for social work education in the United States, as well as the launching of professional social work.

Several countries and jurisdictions require registration or licensure of people working as social workers, and there are mandated qualifications. In other places, a professional association sets academic requirements for admission to the profession. The success of these professional bodies' efforts is demonstrated in that these same requirements are recognized by employers as necessary for employment.

Professional associations
Social workers have several professional associations that provide ethical guidance and other forms of support for their members and social work in general. These associations may be international, continental, semi-continental, national, or regional. The main international associations are the International Federation of Social Workers (IFSW) and the International Association of Schools of Social Work (IASSW).

The largest professional social work association in the United States is the National Association of Social Workers. There also exist organizations that represent clinical social workers such as the American Association of Psychoanalysis in Clinical Social Work. AAPCSW is a national organization representing social workers who practice psychoanalytic social work and psychoanalysis. There are also several states with Clinical Social Work Societies which represent all social workers who conduct psychotherapy from a variety of theoretical frameworks with families, groups, and individuals. The Association for Community Organization and Social Administration (ACOSA) is a professional organization for social workers who practice within the community organizing, policy, and political spheres.

In the UK, the professional association is the British Association of Social Workers (BASW) with just over 18,000 members (as of August 2015).

The Code of Ethics of the US-based National Association of Social Workers provides a code for daily conduct and a set of principles rooted in six core values: service, social justice, dignity and worth of the person, importance of human relationships, integrity, and competence.

Trade unions representing social workers
In the United Kingdom, just over half of social workers are employed by local authorities, and many of these are represented by UNISON, the public sector employee union. Smaller numbers are members of the Unite the Union and the GMB. The British Union of Social Work Employees (BUSWE) has been a section of the trade union Community since 2008.

While at that stage, not a union, the British Association of Social Workers operated a professional advice and representation service from the early 1990s. Social Work qualified staff who are also experienced in employment law and industrial relations provide the kind of representation you would expect from a trade union in the event of a grievance, discipline or conduct matters specifically in respect of professional conduct or practice. However, this service depended on the goodwill of employers to allow the representatives to be present at these meetings, as only trade unions have the legal right and entitlement of representation in the workplace.

By 2011 several councils had realized that they did not have to permit BASW access, and those that were challenged by the skilled professional representation of their staff were withdrawing permission. For this reason BASW once again took up trade union status by forming its arms-length trade union section, Social Workers Union (SWU). This gives the legal right to represent its members whether the employer or Trades Union Congress (TUC) recognizes SWU or not. In 2015 the TUC was still resisting SWU application for admission to congress membership and while most employers are not making formal statements of recognition until the TUC may change its policy, they are all legally required to permit SWU (BASW) representation at internal discipline hearings, etc.

Use of information technology in social work
Information technology is vital in social work, it transforms the documentation part of the work into electronic media. This makes the process transparent, accessible and provides data for analytics. Observation is a tool used in social work for developing solutions. Anabel Quan-Haase in Technology and Society defines the term surveillance as "watching over" (Quan-Haase. 2016. P 213), she continues to explain that the observation of others socially and behaviorally is natural, but it becomes more like surveillance when the purpose of the observation is to keep guard over someone (Quan-Haase. 2016. P 213). Often, at the surface level, the use of surveillance and surveillance technologies within the social work profession is seemingly an unethical invasion of privacy. When engaging with the social work code of ethics a little more deeply, it becomes obvious that the line between ethical and unethical becomes blurred. Within the social work code of ethics, there are multiple mentions of the use of technology within social work practice. The one that seems the most applicable to surveillance or artificial intelligence is 5.02 article f, "When using electronic technology to facilitate evaluation or research" and it goes on to explain that clients should be informed when technology is being used within the practice (Workers. 2008. Article 5.02).

Social workers in literature
In 2011, a critic stated that "novels about social work are rare", and as recently as 2004, another critic claimed to have difficulty finding novels featuring a main character holding a Master of Social Work degree.

However, social workers have been the subject of many novels, including:
 
 
 
 

 
 
 
 
 
 
 
 
 
 
  The basis of the movie Precious.
 Smith, Ali (2011) There But For The, Hamish Hamilton, Pantheon.

Fictional social workers in media

See also

 Addiction medicine
 Approved mental health professional
 Clinical social work
 Child welfare
 Community development
 Critical social work
 Development studies
 Education in social work
 Forensic social work
 Gerontology
 Humanistic social work
 Human resource management
 Human services
 International Social Work
 Jocelyn Hyslop
 Mental health professional
 Recreational therapy
 Right to an adequate standard of living
 Social development
 Social planning
 Social psychology
 Social research
 Social Scientist
 Social work with groups
 Urban development
 Welfare

References

Further reading

External links
 Social Work, WCIDWTM - The University of Tennessee
 Social Work Evaluation and Research Resources

 
Mental health occupations
Welfare agencies
Welfare and service organizations
Academic disciplines
Behavioural sciences
Branches of psychology
Health care occupations
Social sciences
Caregiving
Civil services